Arlando Dwayne Parker Jr. (born February 15, 1998) is an American football cornerback for the San Francisco 49ers of the National Football League (NFL). He played college football at Kansas State.

College career
Parker played for the Kansas State Wildcats for five seasons, redshirting his true freshman year. He finished his collegiate career with 144 tackles, 8.5 tackles for loss, six interceptions and 24 passes defended in 40 games played.

Professional career

Detroit Lions
Parker signed with the Detroit Lions as an undrafted free agent on May 3, 2021. He made the Lions' 53-man roster out of training camp. He was placed on injured reserve on November 24, 2021. He was activated on December 18.

On August 30, 2022, Parker was waived by the Lions and signed to the practice squad the next day. He was promoted to the active roster on October 8, 2022. He was waived on November 11, 2022, and re-signed to the practice squad.

San Francisco 49ers
On January 16, 2023, Parker signed a reserve/future contract with the San Francisco 49ers.

References

External links
Detroit Lions bio
Kansas State Wildcats bio

1998 births
Living people
People from Bartlesville, Oklahoma
Players of American football from Oklahoma
American football cornerbacks
Kansas State Wildcats football players
Detroit Lions players
San Francisco 49ers players